Walter Kintsch (born 1932) is an American Professor Emeritus of Psychology at the University of Colorado Boulder (United States). He is renowned for his groundbreaking theories in cognitive psychology, especially in relation to text comprehension.

Early life 

Walter Kintsch was born in Timișoara, raised in Austria and received his PhD at the University of Kansas in 1960.

Research 

His research focus has been on the study of how people understand language, using both experimental methods and computational modeling techniques. He formulated a psychological process theory of discourse comprehension that views comprehension as a bottom-up process in which various alternatives are explored in parallel, resulting in an incoherent intermediate mental representation that is then cleaned up by an integration process. Integration is a constraint satisfaction process that ensures that those constructions that are linked together become strongly activated, whereas contradictory and irrelevant elements become deactivated. Kintsch details the Construction-Integration (CI) model in Comprehension: A Paradigm for Cognition.

Awards 

In 1992 he won the APA Award for Distinguished Scientific Contributions to Psychology.
He is honored by the Federation of Associations in Behavioral & Brain Sciences as one of the "scientists who have made important and lasting contributions to the sciences of mind, brain, and behavior".
He was awarded an honorary doctorate from the Humboldt University in Berlin in 2001.

Selected publications

 Learning, Memory and Conceptual Processes, Wiley, 1972,
 Memory and Cognition, Wiley, 1977,
 Toward a model of text comprehension and production, Psychological Review, 1978, 85, pp. 363–394
 The role of knowledge in discourse comprehension : a construction-integration model, Psychological Review, 1988, vol 95, pp. 163–182
 Comprehension: A Paradigm for Cognition, Cambridge University Press, 1998,
 The Representation of Meaning in Memory, Erlbaum, 1974. Reprinted, Routledge 2014, Kindle eBook, 2014

References 

Living people
University of Colorado Boulder faculty
1932 births
University of Kansas alumni
Discourse analysts